Ranbhool is an Indian Marathi psychological thriller movie released on 14 May 2010.The movie has been produced by Pratibha Mendhekar and directed by Sanjay Surkar.

Cast 

The cast includes Subodh Bhave, Tejaswini Pandit, Mohan Joshi, Saii Ranade Sane, Vinay Apte & Others.

Soundtrack
The music is provided by Narendra Bhide.

References

External links 
  Ranbhool: A sad story of a deranged killer! - afternoondc.in
  Movie Review - movies.burrp.com
 Movie Review - movies.sulekha.com

2010 films
2010s Marathi-language films